The Byzantine Empire lasted from AD 395 to 1453, during which music was prominent throughout the empire. Both sacred and secular music were commonplace, with sacred music frequently used in church services and secular music in many events including, ceronmonies, dramas, ballets, banquets, festivals and sports games. However, despite its popularity, secular Byzantine music was harshly criticized by the Church Fathers. Like Western contemporaries such as Léonin, Pérotin and Machaut, little information is generally known about the lives of Byzantine composers.

Composers of sacred music, especially hymns and chants, are generally well documented throughout the history of Byzantine music. However, those before the reign of Justinian I are virtually unknown; the monks Anthimos, Auxentios and Timokles are said to have written troparia, but only the text to a single one by Auxentios survives. The first major form was the kontakion, of which Romanos the Melodist was the foremost composer. In the late 7th century the kanōn overtook the kontakion in popularity; Andrew of Crete became its first significant composer, and is traditionally credited as the genre's originator (though modern scholars now doubt this). The kañon reached its peak with the music of John of Damascus and Cosmas of Maiuma and later Theodore of Stoudios and Theophanes the Branded in the 8th and 9th centuries respectively. Composers of secular music are considerably less documented. Not until late in the empire's history are composers known by name, with Joannes Koukouzeles, Xenos Korones and Joannes Glykys as the leading figures. Partly due to the little information concerning them, many modern studies of Byzantine music pay little attention to specific composers.

Like their Western counterparts of the same period, the recorded Byzantine composers were primarily men. Kassia is a major exception to this; she was a prolific and important composer of sticheron hymns and the only woman whose works entered the Byzantine liturgy. A few other women are known to have been composers, Thekla, Theodosia, Martha and the daughter of John Kladas (her given name is unrecorded). Only the latter has any surviving work, a single antiphon. Some Byzantine emperors are known to have been composers, such as Leo VI the Wise, Constantine VII and possibly John III Doukas Vatatzes.

Byzantine composers

References

Notes

Citations

Sources

External links 
 Digitalized Byzantine Manuscripts (Liturgy) at the Princeton Music Library
 Digitalized Byzantine Manuscripts (Hymns) at the Princeton Music Library

 
Byzantine
Composers